The following is a comprehensive discography of C418, the pseudonym of German electronic musician Daniel Rosenfeld and who is best known for producing the majority of the soundtrack of the 2011 video game Minecraft. His discography comprises eight major studio albums, five Bandcamp exclusive studio albums, nine compilation albums, seven EPs, two mixtapes, 11 remixes, seven singles and three music videos.

Albums
Albums are split based on release on major digital download platforms, as opposed to free downloads on Bandcamp.

Studio albums

Based on the original Bandcamp release. The album was released on major streaming platforms on July 16, 2021.

Bandcamp exclusive full-length albums

C418 discontinued the release of The Whatever Director's Cut and is no longer available on Bandcamp. It was available until 2013.

Circle'''s release date is disputed. It is listed as 22 March 2006 on Bandcamp. However, development on the game only began in 2008. Bandcamp's source code states that the album was uploaded on 22 March 2010.

Compilation albums

Extended playsYiff Dad'' was originally released on SoundCloud as an April Fools joke, but is no longer available.

Singles

Guest appearances

Remixes

Mixtapes

Music videos

Notes

References

External links
 C418 discography on Bandcamp
 C418 discography at Discogs

Electronic music discographies
Discographies of German artists